Colocasia is a genus of moths of the family Noctuidae erected by the German actor and entomologist Ferdinand Ochsenheimer.

Species
Colocasia coryli (Linnaeus, 1758)
Colocasia flavicornis (J. B. Smith, 1884)
Colocasia propinquilinea (Grote, 1873)

References
Colocasia at funet

Pantheinae
Taxa named by Ferdinand Ochsenheimer